NRW.Bank (incorporated as NRW.BANK) is the state development bank of North Rhine-Westphalia (NRW) based in Düsseldorf and Münster. Its status is that of a public agency. It is owned by the North Rhine-Westphalia state and supports its structural policy.

History
NRW.Bank was separated from WestLB in 2002.

In 2015, NRW.Bank was included in a European Central Bank list of European institutions and national agencies whose bonds would be eligible for the ECB to buy alongside sovereign debt.

Assignment 
The bank was assigned to act as a community development financial institution.

Activities 
The bank hands out development loans and manages refinancing. Attracting strong criticism, the bank used Credit Default Swaps (CDS). The refinancing by CDS, though thought to be safe by the bank, was illegal.

Controversy
In April 2015, NRW.Bank filed a lawsuit against Austrian "bad bank" Heta Asset Resolution AG for failing to pay  in bonds following the suspension of its debt, imposed by Austrian financial regulators. The North Rhine-Westphalia state government subsequently asked German finance minister Wolfgang Schäuble to intervene and "to do what is politically and legally possible so that contracts or commitments are met."

External links

 Bank Official website

References 

Banks established in 2002
Banks of Germany
Companies based in Düsseldorf
Investment banks
German brands
Primary dealers
2002 establishments in Germany
Government-owned banks